Justin Schmidt (born November 3, 1993) is a former American soccer player.

Career

College and amateur
Schmidt played college soccer at the University of Washington between 2012 and 2016, and in the USL Premier Development League with Washington Crossfire.

Professional
Schmidt was drafted in the second round (35th overall) of the 2017 MLS SuperDraft by Real Salt Lake. Schmidt signed with the club on March 1, 2017. He made his full professional debut for Salt Lake on March 11, 2017 against Chicago Fire.

On February 4, 2018, Schmidt signed with USL side Sacramento Republic for the 2018 season.

Schmidt signed for New Mexico United ahead of their inaugural USL Championship season in 2019.

Following the 2021 season, Schmidt left New Mexico to join the United States Army.

Career statistics

References

External links
 

1993 births
Living people
American soccer players
Association football defenders
Major League Soccer players
Real Monarchs players
Real Salt Lake draft picks
Real Salt Lake players
Sacramento Republic FC players
New Mexico United players
Soccer players from Albuquerque, New Mexico
USL Championship players
USL League Two players
Washington Crossfire players
Washington Huskies men's soccer players